The Ficklin–Crawford Cottage was a historic house located at Charlottesville, Virginia. It was built sometime between 1865 and 1886, and was a -story, three-bay, frame dwelling with Gothic Revival style decorative details. It had a steep bellcast gable roof with deeply projecting eaves.  It originally stood on the southwest corner of Belmont Avenue and Castalia Street, and moved to its final site in 1929.

The house suffered a fire in October 1981, and the owner's insurance deemed it a total loss.  Despite the damage, it was listed on the National Register of Historic Places on October 21, 1982.  However, on November 24 of the same year, the city government granted the owner's request for permission to demolish the structure.

References

Houses on the National Register of Historic Places in Virginia
Carpenter Gothic houses in Virginia
Houses in Charlottesville, Virginia
National Register of Historic Places in Charlottesville, Virginia